Anything Goes: Stephane Grappelli & Yo-Yo Ma Play (Mostly) Cole Porter is an album by Stéphane Grappelli and Yo-Yo Ma, released in 1989. It was produced by Ettore Stratta. The songs were arranged by Roger Kellaway.

Critical reception

The Buffalo News wrote: "Yo-Yo Ma is a bit of a stiff in this context ... but with tone like that and such willingness, who could begrudge him the pleasure of reveling in the suavities of jazz' greatest violinist?"

Track listing 
All songs written by Cole Porter unless otherwise noted.
 "Anything Goes" – 5:51
 "You'd Be So Easy to Love " – 8:23
 "I Concentrate on You" – 3:49
 "Just One of Those Things" – 2:28
 "In the Still of the Night" – 4:43
 "Love of My Life" (Roger Kellaway) – 3:47
 "Pas-De-Two" (Ettore Stratta) – 4:32
 "Sweet Lorraine" (Cliff Burwell) – 7:33
 "So in Love" – 7:27
 "All Through the Night" – 6:19

Personnel 
 Stéphane Grappelli – violin
 Yo-Yo Ma – cello 
 Jon Burr – double bass
 Marc Fosset – guitar
 Daniel Humair – drums 
 Roger Kellaway – piano

Production 
 Ettore Stratta – producer 
 Claude Ermelin – engineer
 Philippe Bouasse – assistant engineer
 Roger Kellaway – arrangements and music direction
 John Frost – photography 
 Ettore Stratta – liner notes

Recorded at Davout Studios, Paris, France.

References 

Yo-Yo Ma albums
Stéphane Grappelli albums
1989 albums
Columbia Records albums
Cole Porter tribute albums